The Basque Country national ice hockey team was the ice hockey team of the Spanish autonomous community of the Basque Country. They are controlled by the Basque Federation of Winter Sports. The team last participated in an international game in 2016, a 4–3 loss to Catalonia.

History
The Basque Country played its first game in 2008 where they played an exhibition game against Catalonia in Vitoria-Gasteiz, Spain. Basque Country lost the game 3–5. The following year, Basque Country competed in a second exhibition game against Catalonia this time held in the Catalan municipality of Puigcerdà. Basque Country won the match 9–1, recording their first win in international competition.

Gorka Extebarria holds the team record for most games played, with two, and most points, with six.

All-time record against other nations
As of 23 December 2016

References

Ice hockey teams in the Basque Country
Former national ice hockey teams
Ice hockey